Lucie Šafářová was the defending champion, but decided not to participate this year.

Mirjana Lučić-Baroni won her first WTA singles title since 1998, defeating Venus Williams 6–4, 6–3 in the final.

Seeds

Draw

Finals

Top half

Bottom half

Qualifying

Seeds

Qualifiers

Qualifying draw

First qualifier

Second qualifier

Third qualifier

Fourth qualifier

Fifth qualifier

Sixth qualifier

References
Main Draw
Qualifying Draw

Coupe Banque Nationale
Tournoi de Québec
Can